A mass stabbing is a single incident in which multiple victims are harmed or killed in a knife-enabled crime. In such attacks, sharp objects are thrust at the victim, piercing through the skin and harming the victim. Examples of sharp instruments used in mass stabbings may include kitchen knives, utility knives, sheath knives, scissors, katanas, hammers, screwdrivers, icepicks, bayonets, axes, machetes and glass bottles. Knife crime poses security threats to many countries around the world.

There are many different factors causing mass stabbing. This may include social inequality, abuse of alcohol and other drugs, easy access to weapons, social and cultural norms, religious and political reasons, among others.

Many actions have been taken to address mass stabbing and knife crimes. This may include enacting new legislation, social and education programs, medical interventions, among others. However, mass stabbing and similar terrorist attacks carried out by Islamic extremists have resulted in the rise of Islamophobia.

Definition
A mass stabbing can be defined from a number of different perspectives. The Oxford English Dictionary defines the verb ‘stab’ as an action that propels a pointed weapon with the intention of harm or murder. A mass stabbing is an incident involving the use of pointed weapons to wound or kill multiple people.

Mass stabbings can be looked at from the scope of knife crime. Based on a publication by the Parliament of the United Kingdom, ‘knife-enabled crime’ is an incident where harm is threatened or caused with the use of bladed weapons. The media also refers to ‘knife crime’ as a stabbing incident or the illegal possession of knives by a person in the public.

From a legal perspective, the phrase mass killing can be used to define a mass stabbing. Based on section 2 of the Investigative Assistance for Violent Crimes Act of 2012 of the United States of America, which was signed into law and published by the US Congress on 13 January 2013, ‘mass killing’ is an individual occasion with three or more people murdered.Mass stabbings can also be looked at from the perspective of mass murder. The Federal Bureau of Investigation (FBI) of the United States of America has defined mass murder as an incident where four or more people are killed in a single incident on a continuing basis without any significant time period in between each of the murders.

Causes
A World Health Organisation (WHO) report states that past victimisation is one of the risk factors causing violence. Children and young people with adverse experience are particularly prone to being perpetrators or victims of violence.

Abuse of alcohol is another risk factor that cause people, particularly young people to involve in violence such as knife crime. Research by WHO found that the incidence of violence was higher in countries with greater ease of access to alcohol. Similarly, drug abuse is another possible cause of knife crime. Illicit drug trade has been linked to the increasing incidence of knife crime. Examples of drugs that are particularly linked to acts of violence include tobacco, cocaine and amphetamines.

WHO has also stated that there is a strong correlation between violence and social inequality and deprivation. The larger the differences in income between the high-income group and the low-income group, the higher the incidence of homicides.

Another factor that may have led to knife crimes and violence among young people is the social and cultural norms in the environment they are exposed to. This may be due to the exposure of young people to violent behaviour of family members, friends or other members of society, which lead them to think that acts of violence are normal and acceptable. This group of people may have been exposed to various contents containing different forms of violence in the mass media which may have affected the behaviour of the young people.

Spreading of religious extremism by terrorist groups, such as al-Qaeda and Islamic State of Iraq and the Levant (IS), may be another cause of mass stabbings. Both terrorist groups used publications such as Dabiq of IS and Inspire of al-Qaeda to propagate the ideologies of the organisations and demonize their opponents, particularly the western democracy and their values. The terrorist organisations have encouraged their followers to launch attacks with knives because it is a cheap and easy method which is difficult to be detected by authorities yet capable of causing great harm to the general public.

Political reasons may be another cause of mass stabbings. Various studies have been conducted by scholars and researchers to examine the relationship between political repression and terrorism. In general, there is a lack of consensus on the relationship between repression and violence. Some studies argued that political repression may turn non-violent groups to acts of violence. However, another study showed that there was a positive correlation between repression and violence in the short-run, but the correlation turns negative in the long-run.

Reactions to mass stabbings

Government and law enforcement 
The Government of the United Kingdom has announced on 31 January 2019 that they will introduce the Knife Crime Prevention Orders through an amendment to the Offensive Weapons Bill in conjunction with the government's effort in tackling knife crime. The new preventative order can be placed on any person aged 12 or over, where curfews, geographical restrictions and social media restrictions may be imposed on the targets of the police. Retailers are also forbidden from selling knives to any person aged 18 or below. The law is aimed at reducing knife crimes especially among young people. Criminal prosecution, fines or jail sentences may be applied on any person who breaches the law.

Pressure from the public and changes in laws have also mandated tougher sentences from the judiciary on knife crime offences. England and Wales saw 85% of their knife crime offenders jailed for at least three months. The average jail sentence for these offenders was eight months in 2018, an increment of three months from the average a decade ago. In Scotland, there was a threefold increase in average sentence for carrying a knife in 2015 when compared to the data from 10 years ago.

Members of the law enforcement community has also lobbied the government for extra funding to tackle crimes. The Government of the United Kingdom has also announced extra funding of £100m to security forces in England and Wales to tackle crimes, specifically knife crimes.

Countries like Brazil and Australia have also introduced laws to restrict the sale of alcohol at specific times of a day. Studies in Diadema, Brazil has shown that homicides were reduced by 44% in the course of three years with the introduction of a law that restricts trading hours for alcoholic products.

Schools 
Schools have also taken precautionary measure to prevent knife crime in school compounds. A WHO report states that creating safe learning environment in schools is critical in preventing violence and knife crime among young people.

A direct approach taken by some schools in the United States of America was installing weapon detection systems in schools. This is to prevent weapons such as guns and knives from being brought into schools and threaten the safety of the community.

Another initiative taken by some schools is the introduction of bully-prevention programs in schools. An example of such programs is the Olweus Program, which is originated from Norway and is currently implemented in Australia, Lithuania, the Netherlands, the United Kingdom and the United States of America. The KiVa program in Finland is another successful anti-bullying program in Europe.

Education programs aimed at reducing knife crime has also been introduced. For example, the Be Safe Project in the United Kingdom educates students about the legal, social and health implications of knife crime.

Others 
In Scotland, knife crime is treated as a public health issue and a public funded initiative was launched to address the root cause of knife crimes. The initiative is participated by law enforcement agencies like the police, social services and other organisations. For example, No Knives, Better Lives, an organisation launched in 2009, works with the Scottish police, schools and volunteers to raise awareness among young people on knife crime prevention. Gang members were also invited to a meeting with the police, health professionals, victims and social service workers where they discussed the implications of knife crime and violence. They were offered with assistance in employment, housing and education to help them depart from violence and knife crime.

Parenting programs were launched in many countries around the world to improve parenting skills. WHO has stated that interventions in parenting skills can be beneficial to parent-children relationship and prevent violence amongst young people. Examples of parenting programs includes Nurse-Family Partnership, Triple P and The Incredible Years.

Rise of Islamophobia 
Some scholars and experts believe that knife crime, mass stabbing and terrorist attacks have caused a surge in Islamophobia.

Based on a report by Tell Mama, there was a 26% increase in anti-Muslim attacks in the United Kingdom from 2017 to 2018. Some experts have attributed the backlash against the Islamic religion and Muslims to the terrorist attacks in the United Kingdom which were carried out by Muslims. Example of terrorist attacks in the United Kingdom include Manchester Arena Bombing, London Bridge attack and Westminster attack. All of the attacks happened in the United Kingdom in 2017.

Another research from California State University, San Bernardino, has found that there was a 78% rise in hate crimes against Muslims in the United States of America in 2015. Police reports in 2016 also stated that hate crimes and violence against Muslim communities in the United States of America were on the rise.

Examples of mass stabbing cases

2014 Kunming attack 

On March 1, 2014, a group of eight male and female attackers wielding knives attacked a railway station at Kunming, the provincial capital of Yunnan, in the southwest of China. 31 people were killed, and a further 141 were wounded. Authorities and the official news service of China, Xinhua, said that the knife attack was an act of terrorism carried out by Uighur separatists from Xinjiang, a province at the far west of China. The incident is now known as '3-01' in China. It was also called "China's 9-11" by the Global Times, a state-run media in China. Authorities increased security in the Xinjiang region following the attack.

2016 Sagamihara knife attack 

At 2:20 am on 26 July 2016, a man launched a knife attack at a center for the disabled people at Sagamihara, a town west of Tokyo, Japan. 19 residents of the care center were killed, and an additional 26 people were wounded. The suspect, former employee Satoshi Uematsu, surrendered himself at a police station near the site of the attack shortly after. He delivered a handwritten letter to a Japanese politician where he threatened to kill 470 severely disabled people. He also advocated for legislation that would allow the disabled people to be euthanized with consents from their family members. He was hospitalized but was subsequently released after two weeks. Charged with murder, Uematsu was eventually sentenced to death. The attack was the worst mass killing case in Japan in decades.

2017 London Bridge attack 

On 3 June 2017, a terrorist vehicle-ramming and stabbing took place in London, England, UK. A van was deliberately driven into pedestrians on London Bridge, and then crashed on Borough High Street, just south of the River Thames. The van's three occupants then ran to the nearby Borough Market area and began stabbing people in and around restaurants and pubs. They were shot dead by Metropolitan Police and City of London Police authorised firearms officers. Eight people were killed, and 48 others were injured, including members of the public and four unarmed police officers who attempted to stop the assailants.

2022 Saskatchewan stabbings 

On September 4, 2022, 29 people were stabbed, 11 of whom were killed, in at least thirteen locations in the James Smith Cree Nation and Weldon, Saskatchewan, Canada. Alerts relating to the incidents were extended to Manitoba and Alberta. Some of the victims were believed to have been targeted, while others were randomly attacked. On September 7, 2022, the suspect, identified as Myles Sanderson, was found and arrested near Rosthern. Shortly after being taken into custody, Sanderson died from self-inflicted injuries.

2022 University of Idaho stabbings 

In the early hours of November 13, 2022, four University of Idaho students were fatally stabbed in their off-campus residence in Moscow, Idaho. On December 30, a suspect, 28-year-old Bryan Christopher Kohberger, was arrested in Monroe County, Pennsylvania, on four counts of first-degree murder and felony burglary.

References 

 
Violence
Mass murder
Killings by type